Maya Hossam Asmar (born 14 August 1976), better known by her stage name Maya Nasri, is a Lebanese singer, recording artist, and actress.

Early life
Nasri studied acting and directing theater, television and cinema at the Lebanese University. In 1996, she started working as a TV presenter at Télé Liban, she also worked as a model.

Career
Nasri participated in "Kas El Nojoum" in 1998 on the Lebanese Broadcasting Channel where she won all three gold medals. Her debut single, "Khalleeni Bel Jaw", topped several charts and launched her music career. Since then, she has released four studio albums and several singles such as "Akhbarak Eih?", "Law Kan Lak Alb", "Habbit Hob", "El Asmarani", and "Rouh". Even though Nasri was largely successful in her music career, in 2008 she decided to shift to a career in acting and has halted her music career until now. Since then, she has starred in several Egyptian movies and TV shows.

Personal life 
In 2010, Nasri married Egyptian filmmaker Ihab Lamey in a Church wedding ceremony in Beirut. On 5 October 2013, she gave birth to their first child, a girl they named Mikaella. Nasri announced online the news of daughter's birth with the message: "I gave birth to the most beautiful thing my eyes have ever seen. It was the gift of God to my small family".
In 2015, during the pregnancy of her second child she revealed that a sonogram showed complications, which meant the fetus would require heart surgery within the first 10 days after birth. The life-saving surgery was performed on her son Giovanni, after he was born on 3 February 2015. On 18 December 2017, she gave birth to her third child, a girl, Manuella.

Discography 
Akhbarak Eih? (2001)  (How are you doing?)
Law Kan Lak Alb (2003)  (If You Had a Heart)
Izzay Te’rafni (2005)  (How Do You Know Me?)
Jayi Lwa't (2008)  (The Time is Coming..)

Singles 
 "Enta habib 3yone" (1999)
 "Akher Hammi" (1999)
 "Ana Bahtaglak" (2004)
 "Aywa Keda" (2006/2007)
 "Ana Kont Eh" (2006/2007)

Videography 
 "Khallini bel Jaw" (2001)
 "Akhbarak Eih..?" (2001) – Tony Abou Elias
 "Ya Waheshni (2002)" – Myirna khayyat
 "Law Kan Lak Alb (2003)" – Ahmad El Mahdi
 "Ana Bahtaglak (2004)" – Mirna Khayyat Abou-Elias
 "Habit Hob (2004)" – Mhd. Gomea
 "Al Asmarani (2005)" – Salim elTurk
 "Rouh]] (2006)" – Emile Slaylati
 "Jaye ElWa2t" (2008) – Ahmad El Mahdi

Filmography 
 Code 36 (2007) – Egyptian movie
 Sultan elGharam ("Sultan of Love") (2007) – Egyptian TV series
 Kharej An elQanoun ("Against the Law") (2007) – Egyptian movie
 Wekalet Atiyya (2009) – Egyptian TV series
 eldictator (2009) – Egyptian movie
 Rijal Alhasm (2009) – Syrian TV series
 Men kel albeh (2011) - Lebanese TV series
 Al Serr (2017) - Egyptian Series (waiting to be released)
 Zenzana 7 (2020) - Egyptian movie
 ''Rima" (2019) (Out Soon) Egyptian movie.

References

External links 

 

1976 births
Living people
Lebanese film actresses
Lebanese television actresses
21st-century Lebanese women singers
Lebanese models
People from Akkar Governorate
Lebanese Christians
Singers who perform in Egyptian Arabic
Lebanese University alumni